The 1972 Chico State Wildcats football team represented California State University, Chico as a member of the Far Western Conference (FWC) during the 1972 NCAA College Division football season. Led by fifth-year head coach Pete Riehlman, Chico State compiled an overall record of 4–5 with a mark of 2–3 in conference play, tying for third place in the FWC. The team was outscored by its opponents 188 to 154 for the season. The Wildcats played home games at University Stadium in Chico, California.

Schedule

References

Chico State
Chico State Wildcats football seasons
Chico State Wildcats football